El Camino Memorial Park cemetery is located at 5600 Carroll Canyon Road in the Sorrento Valley neighborhood of San Diego. Founded in 1960, El Camino is a  memorial park and is the final resting site for Jonas Salk (who discovered the polio vaccine and founded the renowned Salk Institute), as well as several members of the well-known Kroc family (humanitarians, philanthropist, former owners of San Diego Padres baseball team, as well as Ray Kroc's position as C.E.O of McDonald's fast food chain). There are many other prominent citizens from the greater San Diego and Los Angeles area as well.

Notable interments
Jonas Salk (1914–1995), medical researcher, discoverer of the polio vaccine
Ray Ceresino (1929–2015), ice hockey player
Kazimierz Deyna (1947–1989), Polish footballer (until 2012) 
Billy Daniels (1915–1988), singer
Joseph Coors Sr. (1917–2003), COO of Coors Brewing Company and grandson of the founder, personal advisor to president Ronald Reagan
Cedric Montgomery Durst (1896–1971), professional baseball player
Preston Foster (1900–1970), songwriter, guitarist and Emmy nominated actor
Dorothy Kelly (1894–1966), actress (also known as Dorothy O'Kelly)
Ray Kroc (1902–1984), founding partner of McDonald's, owner of San Diego Padres baseball team
Joan Kroc (1928–2003), wife of Ray Kroc, humanitarian
Violet La Plante (1908–1984), actress, sister of actress Laura La Plante
Todd Loren (1960–1992), (real name Stuart Shapiro), comic book publisher, founder of Revolutionary Comics
Maria Goeppert-Mayer (1906–1972), physicist and Nobel Prize winner
William Nierenberg (1919–2000), scientist, member of the Manhattan Project
Patti Page (1927–2013), singer and actress
Charles Alan Pownall (1887–1979) WWII Naval Admiral, the last military governor of Guam.
Allard Roen (1921–2008, Managing Director of casinos and resorts in Las Vegas, Nevada and Carlsbad, California.
Pete Rozelle (1926–1996), commissioner of the National Football League from 1960 to 1989
Milburn Stone (1904–1980), Emmy award-winning film and television actor
Lee Shippey (1884–1969), author and journalist
Paul Trousdale (1915–1990), real estate developer.
Barbara Werle (1928–2013), actress

See also
Cemeteries of San Diego

References

External links
El Camino Memorial Park official website
 Find a Grave.com "El Camino Memorial Park"
 San Diego Weekly Reader - "Underground With the Celebrity Dead" by Jay Allen Sanford, Oct. 27, 2005
 "San Diegans Are Going HOG WILD over El Camino's New Harley Davidson", Business Wire,  March 14, 2007

Cemeteries in San Diego County, California
Geography of San Diego
History of San Diego